Presidential elections were held in Kazakhstan for the first time on 1 December 1991. Nursultan Nazarbayev was elected with 99% of the vote, based on a turnout of 88%.

Background
On 24 April 1990, the Supreme Council of the Kazakh SSR established the post of President of the Kazakh SSR and chose its chairman Nursultan Nazarbayev to be the president for a term of 6 years.

Due to the preceding events of the collapse of the Soviet Union, on 16 October 1991, the Supreme Council of the Kazakh SSR set the election day for 1 December. The law established requirements for a 100,000 signatures in order to be qualified to be a presidential candidate, which coincided with the requirements of the relevant law of the Russian SFSR, although the population of the Kazakh SSR was several times smaller.

On 24 October 1991, Nazarbayev was registered by the Central Election Commission to be the incumbent candidate with his running mate Yerik Asanbayev to be on a secret ballot.

The members of the Supreme Council proposed a writer, Olzhas Suleimenov, to be the candidate but he declined the offer. Hasen Qojahmetov, leader of the Jeltoqsan National Democratic Party, did not have the required number of signatures for the election.

Results

References

1991 elections in the Soviet Union
1991 elections in Kazakhstan
1991
Single-candidate elections